Adam Billaut (31 January 1602 – 18 May 1662) was a French carpenter, poet and singer. Nicknamed "the Virgil of rabot" he is considered one of the first poet-workers.

Billaut divided his time between Paris, where he met Antoine Girard de Saint-Amant, Guillaume Colletet, Paul Scarron and Michel de Marolles, and Nevers, where he married Catherine Fox in 1630. He received patronage from Marie Louise Gonzaga and the Prince of Condé, and he was also pensioned by Cardinal Richelieu.

He wrote a number of books, including Les Chevilles, which enjoyed some critical success when it was published in 1644, Le Vilebrequin, published posthumously in 1663, and Le Rabot, which was never printed''.

Principal publications
 Ode à Monseigneur le cardinal duc de Richelieu, par le menuisier de Nevers, 1639
 Les Chevilles de maître Adam, menuisier de Nevers, préface de l'abbé de Marolles, 1644
 Stances de maître Adam au parc de Nevers, sur le départ de la sérénissime reine de Pologne, 1645
 Ode pour monseigneur le Prince, par maître Adam, menuisier de Nevers, 1648
 Le Vilebrequin de maître Adam, menuisier de Nevers, contenant toutes sortes de poésies gallantes, tant en sonnets, épîtres, épigrammes, élégies, madrigaux, que stances et autres pièces, 1663
 Poésies de maître Adam Billaut, 1842
 Appendice aux poésies de maître Adam, menuisier de Nevers, 1842

References
 François Gimet, workers poets Gallery. The proletarians muses: Adam Billaut, Jean Reboul, Jasmine, Magu, Marius Fourtoul, Rouget, Voitelain Louis, Charles Poncy Auguste Abadie, Queen Guard, Paris: E. Fareu, 1856
 Guy Thuillier, "Adam Billaut Nivernais and seventeenth-century writers," Nevers Nevers Municipal Library and Academic Society of Nivernais, 2002

1602 births
1662 deaths
17th-century French poets
17th-century French male writers
People from Nevers
French male poets